Abdurrahim Buza (22 December 1905–7 November 1986) was an Albanian painter.

Education 
He was born on December 22, 1905, in Skopje, Ottoman Empire (present-day North Macedonia) in a family from Gjakova. He lost his parents at the age of nine. In 1924 the young man managed to move to Albania with the intention of pursuing his academic dream. He pursued basic education in Shkodra and then secondary studies at the Qemal Stafa High School in Tirana with the help of Bajram Curri. As a student there, he took an active part in the so-called Democratic Revolution of June 1924. Buza was later granted a government scholarship for further studies in Fine Arts in Italy. His lead teachers of Turin and Galileo Chini at the Academy of Fine Arts in Florence (1928–1932) were among the most influential fine artists of the time in Italy. In 1933, he successfully completed his studies with a degree in Monumental and Decorative Painting.

Career
After his studies Buza went back to Albania and became a professor of drawing at the “Harry Fultz” high school. In 1933 Buza, in a collaborative effort with his contemporaries, the painter A. Kushi, the sculptor Odhise Paskali, and the Italian painter Mario Ridola, founded the Drawing Artistic School, which was the first Fine Arts school to open in Tirana, Albania. This school set the artistic and aesthetic stage for the new Albanian artists’ generation to come. In 1935, he painted the first Albanian Nude at a time when the Albanian society considered a nude immoral and unacceptable. Buza's national level exhibit was held in April 1945. Mr. Buza was the illustrator of one of the most important documents in the history of the Albanian education, the first Albanian language primer, published in 1945.  Buza taught at Artistic High School “Jordan Misja” in Tirana in 1947 until he retired in 1966.

His exemplary work in drafting the curriculum, and its continuous reformation provided a healthy artistic foundation for the students. During the years of communist dictatorship in Albania, the artist A. Buza continued his work ignoring all hackneyed forms that were artificially imposed to the Eastern European artists, and preserved his values and artistic dignity.

Artistic style
His artistic style was characterized by bright colors and a certain peasant naivety. There was a wide range of themes in his painting which consisted of  both portraits to landscapes in Pogradec and Tirana, The subjects of his paintings were historical, legendary and nationalist. During the 1930s, his drawings depicted the unemployed, the poor, refugees and orphans and portrayed the tense spirit of the War of National Liberation. After the war, themes of his painting focused on the right of the Albanian people to self-determination. During this time, his celebrated the dramatic reconstruction of Albania in the aftermath of World War II.

He brought a modern reality in the Albanian art, using impressionist and expressionist elements in interconnection with his naive and symbolic style.

Accomplishments
During his life, Buza created over 500 oil paintings and thousands of drawings and graphics. His works are preserved in the National Gallery of Arts in Tirana and lip Museum in Tirana. He was honored by the Albanian Parliament with the award “Painter of Merit” in 1960 and the “Painter of the People” award in 1978.

Notable works 
 
 
  (1950)
  (1957)
  (1960)

See also
List of Albanian painters

References

External links
Nostalgia
Albanianarts.com

1905 births
1987 deaths
People's Artists of Albania
Qemal Stafa High School alumni
20th-century Albanian painters
Artists from Tirana
20th-century male artists
Albanian male painters
Yugoslav emigrants to Albania